Neogalerucella calmariensis, the black-margined loosestrife beetle, is a species of skeletonizing leaf beetle in the family Chrysomelidae. It is found in Europe and Northern Asia (excluding China). It was introduced in North America to combat the purple loosestrife, Lythrum salicaria, and it has spread to a number of states.

References

Galerucinae
Beetles described in 1767
Taxa named by Carl Linnaeus